Mohammed Ali Shah may refer to
Muhammad Ali Shah (1777–1842), the third King of Oudh (an Indian state)
Mohammad Ali Shah Qajar (1872–1925), the sixth king of the Qajar Dynasty, Shah of Persia (Iran)